The Oklahoma Aeronautics Commission (OAC) is an agency of state government that is responsible for promoting aviation in the State. Under the supervision of the Oklahoma Secretary of Transportation, the Commission fosters the growth of the aerospace industry and ensures that the needs of business and communities in the State are met by the State's airports. The Commission encourages the establishment and maintenance of public airports, including the preservation and improvement of the State's 110 public airports.

The Oklahoma Aeronautics Commission's mission is to promote aviation, which includes ensuring that the needs of commerce and communities across Oklahoma are met by the state's 110 public airports that comprise the state's air transportation system, and ensuring the growth and vitality of the state's aerospace industry.

The commission is composed of seven members, each appointed by the Governor of Oklahoma, serving six-year terms. Five members are appointed from among Oklahoma's five congressional districts with the remaining two appointed at-large. The commission is responsible for appointing the State Director of Aeronautics to serve at its pleasure. The current director is Victor Bird, having served in that position since December 2002.

The commission was established in 1963 during the term of Governor Henry Bellmon.

History
The commission was created by the Oklahoma Legislature in 1963. Its predecessor was the Oklahoma Aviation Commission.

Leadership
The Aeronautics Commission is under the supervision of the Secretary of Transportation. Under current Governor of Oklahoma Mary Fallin, Mike Patterson is serving as the Secretary.

The commission is composed of seven members, each appointed by the Governor of Oklahoma. Each member serves a six-year term. One member is appointed from among each of Oklahoma's congressional districts with the remaining two appointed from the State at-large. To be appointed to the commission, a member must be a citizen of the State with at least three years experience in aeronautics activities. The governor may remove any member of the commission for inefficiency or neglect of duty.

As of FY17, the members of the commission are as follows:
Chairman Michael Ray - District 3
Secretary Dr. David Conway - District 2
Kevin Potter - District 1
Vice Chair Wes Stucky - District 4
Dave Amis, III - District 5
Joe Harris - At-Large
Jerry Hunter - At-Large

Budget
The Aeronautics Commission is a non-appropriated State agency. As such, it does not rely upon annual appropriations from the Oklahoma Legislature in order to function. Instead, the commission is funded by a dedicated 0.0008% tax on motor fuels bought for aircraft use and a dedicated 3.25% tax on the purchase of aircraft. Those two dedicated taxes make up 80% of the commission's annual budget. The remaining 20% comes from federal grants and other fees for the commission's services. About half of that budget is dedicated to providing assistance to local airport improvement projects. The remainder is used to operate the agency and to provide educational activities to inform the public about aeronautics.

See also
Federal Aviation Administration

External links
Oklahoma Aeronautics Commission official website

Aeronautics
Aeronautics
Aeronautics